Maxie Foy Williams (June 28, 1940 – July 7, 2009) was an American football offensive lineman in the American Football League and the National Football League. He was drafted by the Houston Oilers in the 10th round of the 1965 AFL Draft and also played for the Miami Dolphins. Williams played college football at Southeastern Louisiana.

Early years
Williams played high school football at Granite Falls High School in Granite Falls, North Carolina. During his junior year, he was a part of the Granite Falls High 1956 North Carolina state champion football team.

College career
After graduating from high school, Williams would serve in the U.S. Army from 1958 to 1961. Following that, he then played college football at Southeastern Louisiana. As an offensive lineman, he was an All-American as a senior, and twice named to the All-Gulf State Conference team. In 1973, Williams was induced into the Southeastern Louisiana Athletics Hall of Fame.

Professional career
Williams was drafted by the Houston Oilers in the 10th round (74th overall) of the 1965 AFL draft. After playing his first season in Houston, Williams was picked up by the Miami Dolphins in the 1966 AFL expansion draft. The 1966 Miami Dolphins season would be the team's first season. Williams played his last five seasons of professional football with the Dolphins from 1966 to 1970.

References

1940 births
2009 deaths
Players of American football from North Carolina
American football offensive tackles
American football offensive guards
Southeastern Louisiana Lions football players
Houston Oilers players
Miami Dolphins players
American Football League players
People from Granite Falls, North Carolina